Royal Air Force Winfield or more simply RAF Winfield is a former Royal Air Force satellite station located near Paxton, Scottish Borders, Scotland and west of Berwick-upon-Tweed, Northumberland, England.

The following units were here at some point:
 Satellite for No. 54 Operational Training Unit RAF (May 1942 - May 1945)
 A detachment from No. 88 Squadron RAF (1941-42)
 No. 222 Squadron RAF (1942)

References

Citations

Bibliography

Royal Air Force stations of World War II in the United Kingdom
Royal Air Force stations in Scotland
Military airbases established in 1941